Bodeasa may refer to several places in Romania:

Bodeasa, a village in Dealu Morii Commune, Bacău County
Bodeasa, a village in Săveni town, Botoșani County
Bodeasa (river), a tributary of the Bașeu in Botoșani County